The official flag of Milwaukee was adopted in 1954. A 2004 survey by the North American Vexillological Association rated the Milwaukee flag 147th out of 150 flags of major American cities.

Description
The flag displays symbols of Milwaukee on a medium blue background, with the city name below all the elements. In the center, a gear, representing industry, bears symbols of Milwaukee's identity and history. An Indian head, resembling the Milwaukee Braves logo at the time, represents Native American origins. A flag with two stars, said to be a Civil War-era flag, may also represent a service flag. A lamp symbol in the upper right was once associated with the Milwaukee City Library. Below this is Milwaukee City Hall, representing government, which is flanked by abstract outlines of a church, housing, a factory, the Milwaukee Arena, and the former County Stadium (demolished in 2001) along a straight shoreline with waves representing Lake Michigan. The golden barley stalk on the left represents Milwaukee's brewing history, and the red ship with water symbolizes Milwaukee's status as a port city, with the 1846 date of city incorporation from the merger with Byron Kilbourn's Kilbourntown and Solomon Juneau's Juneautown on the flag's right vertically.

History

First proposals
The first attempt to introduce a civic flag came in an 1897 Milwaukee Journal contest. The winning entry included an oak branch with the motto "Steady Progress" over a cream-colored field. The design was praised by then-mayor William C. Rauschenberger, who lost reelection shortly thereafter. The flag was never officially used by the city.

Original city flag
In 1917, Alderman Frederick C. Bogk called for a city flag as part of an ambitious plan for Milwaukee's growth, along with expanding the harbor, investing in infrastructure, preserving residential districts, and annexing the innermost suburbs.  The flag never came to fruition.

In 1927, the Common Council adopted the city's first official city flag, a field of Alice blue with the city seal in golden orange in the center.  The flag was given to the Milwaukee Police Department to be carried in parades, and quickly fell into disuse.

The following year, the Hamburg America cruise line decided to christen its newest ship the MS Milwaukee.  The company requested Milwaukee's city flag be brought to Germany for her launching ceremony.  Rather than send the Alice blue flag introduced just the year before, the city considered a new flag design, incorporating alternating angled bars of green and blue emblazoned with a cream-colored "M" over a red circle.

1950 re-design contest
Efforts continued to introduce a new city flag.  In 1942, Alderman Fred P. Meyers introduced a new resolution in the Common Council proposing "a special city flag committee composed of aldermen and public-spirited citizens who, with the co-operation of the art commission and other art institutions would be commissioned to recommend a design to be ready for Milwaukee's one 
 birthday" on January 31, 1946.  The anniversary came and went without any action from the council.

In the 1950s, Alderman Meyers re-introduced his proposed bill.  Milwaukee leaders discovered it was one of only four cities with a population over 500,000 without a flag, and so the city held a contest for flag designs.  The winner was 17-year old Milwaukeean Alfred P. Dannenmann, who created a flag featuring three interlocking gears labeled "HOMES", "INDUSTRY", and "SHIPPING" between a banner reading "MILWAUKEE" and the date "1846".  Dannenmann was awarded a $100 savings bond, but his design was not officially adopted by the city.  Instead, the city's art commission decided to design a new flag itself, incorporating elements of several entries from the previous year's contest. Former alderman Fred Steffan combined elements of some of the better entries to create the flag.

1975 re-design contest
In 1975 the city held another contest for a new flag design.  Lee Tishler, a Milwaukee Public Museum employee, won with a bright yellow banner featuring symbols of civic life.  Although Tishler was awarded the contest's prize of a $100 savings bond in a ceremony at City Hall, his flag was not adopted.

2001 re-design contest
In 2001, the Milwaukee Arts Board of the Milwaukee Common Council held a contest to attract designs for a new flag. Over 105 designs were submitted, but none met with the approval of the board, and the old design was kept. In a 2004 poll conducted by the North American Vexillological Association, the flag of Milwaukee was rated the fourth worst of all major cities in the United States.

"The People's Flag"

In 2015, in response to negative media coverage spurred by a 99% Invisible episode, Steve Kodis, a local graphic designer, partnered with Greater Together, an AIGA-affiliated non-profit, to launch a flag contest called "The People's Flag of Milwaukee". The public submitted 1,006 entries, from which five finalists were chosen in 2016. In an online poll of over 6,000 people, a design called "Sunrise Over the Lake" received the highest rating of the five. The flag's design is described as follows:

The organizers of the contest released the design into the public domain, deciding to let the flag gain popular acceptance before pushing for official recognition. Since its introduction, the People's Flag has been adopted by local businesses and used on commercial products from bicycles to microbrew labels. The Milwaukee Brewers sell merchandise featuring a combination of the flag image and their retro "mb ball-in-glove" logo.

On July 19, 2018, the Milwaukee Common Council's Steering and Rules Committee took up a proposal to designate the People's Flag of Milwaukee as the city's new official flag. That committee voted 6–2 to revisit the proposal at another meeting by the end of the year. In November of that year the City of Milwaukee's Arts Board said the original search for a new flag wasn't inclusive enough, as at least one Milwaukee politician charged that the process had not made enough efforts to include individuals without internet access, and that the flag may go back to the drawing board.

Opposition
Within the last decade, even before the proposed new design of 2016, the current flag has had renewed support, including those who oppose its replacement. Furthermore, the People's Flag process in general has been criticized, especially with respect to the relatively small number of judges and voters involved in the 2016 vote. During a discussion about adopting the new flag, Alderwoman Chantia Lewis said it would not be fair to let "15 people change the entire flag for 600,000 people".  Alderman Russell Stamper questioned whether the campaign represented the entire city, and then-Alderman Bob Donovan reported that only one constituent had reached out to him about the flag issue, and that person was opposed to changing the current flag.

References

External links

Flag
Flags of cities in Wisconsin
Flags introduced in 1927
Flags introduced in 1928
Flags introduced in 1954
1954 establishments in Wisconsin